The 1973 Victorian state election, in Australia was held on 19 May 1973.

Retiring Members

Labor
Larry Floyd MLA (Williamstown)
Denis Lovegrove MLA (Sunshine)
Campbell Turnbull MLA (Brunswick West)

Liberal
Sir Vernon Christie MLA (Ivanhoe)
Jim Manson MLA (Ringwood)
Sir George Reid MLA (Box Hill)
Russell Stokes MLA (Evelyn)
Alex Taylor MLA (Balwyn)
Robert Trethewey MLA (Bendigo)
Sir Gilbert Chandler MLC (Boronia)

Country
Russell McDonald MLA (Rodney)
George Moss MLA (Murray Valley)
Arthur Mansell MLC (North Western)

Legislative Assembly
Sitting members are shown in bold text. Successful candidates are highlighted in the relevant colour. Where there is possible confusion, an asterisk (*) is also used.

Legislative Council
Sitting members are shown in bold text. Successful candidates are highlighted in the relevant colour. Where there is possible confusion, an asterisk (*) is also used.

References

Psephos - Adam Carr's Election Archive

Victoria
Candidates for Victorian state elections